Azymuth is a Brazilian jazz-funk trio formed in 1973.  The original band members were the  late Jose Roberto Bertrami (keyboards), Alex Malheiros (bass, guitars), and Ivan Conti (drums, percussion).

History
From 1979 to 1988, they released many albums for Milestone Records. They also had a major hit single with "Jazz Carnival", a product of their Light as a Feather album, in 1979.  It peaked at number 19 in the UK Singles Chart in January 1980. Since the mid-1990s, they have released albums on the London based Far Out Recordings label, while remaining based in Brazil, and continue to tour in Europe.

Azymuth have also been involved in producing albums and their artists have been involved in several other projects through the years, including an album by Brazilian singer-songwriter Ana Mazzotti, and the 2005 debut album, Equilibria, by Alex Malheiros's daughter Sabrina Malheiros.  They call their music "Samba Doido", which means "Crazy Samba". Since the advent of the remix, many of Azymuth's songs have been redone by a wide range of artists and musicians. Several electronic acts like Jazzanova among many others, can be heard remixing their works.

Solo careers
Ivan "Mamão" Conti has released several solo records, including The Human Factor (Milestone, 1984). In 2008, Conti and hip hop musician Madlib released an album as "Jackson-Conti" titled Sujinho.

Alex Malheiros has released Atlantic Forest (Milestone, 1985), Zenith (Niterói Discos, 1992) and The Wave (Far Out, 2009).

Bertrami had the largest solo career. His album Things Are Different (Far Out Recordings, 2001) featured Robertinho Silva among others.  Bertrami died on July 8, 2012 at age 66.

Other contributors
Ariovaldo Contesini was the original fourth member and percussionist. He provided percussion during the recording session of the Azimuth EP and album in 1975. However, Contesini left the band shortly after completing the album.
Jota Moraes is a keyboardist, who filled in for Bertrami after his departure from the group in 1988. He recorded as a member of Azymuth for the next two albums after the former's departure. Bertrami returned to his role upon the reunion of Azymuth in the mid-1990
Marinho Boffa joined Azymuth in recording sessions with German saxophonist Jürgen Seefelder.

Discography

Pre-Azymuth

Studio albums 
 1972: Som Ambiente - CID Entertainment (with Marcos Valle, credited as 'Som Ambiente')
 1972: Brazil by Music Fly Cruzeiro - Serviços Aéreos Cruzeiro do Sul ('uncredited')

Single 
 1972: "Concerto para um Verão" / "The Girl from Paramaribo" (with Marcos Valle, credited as 'Alan and his Orchestra')

As Azymuth

Original motion picture soundtrack 
 1973 - O Fabuloso Fittipaldi - Philips Records (with Marcos Valle)

Studio albums 
1975: Azimüth (original issue on Som Livre) - 2CD reissue on Far Out Recordings
1977: Aguia Não Come Mosca (Atlantic)
1979: Light as a Feather (Milestone)
1979: Live at the Copacabana Palace (Isis)
1980: Dear Prelude (Compilation)
1980: Outubro (Milestone)
1982: Cascades (Milestone)
1982: Telecommunication (Milestone)
1984: Rapid Transit (Milestone)
1984: Flame (Milestone)
1985: Spectrum (Milestone)
1986: Tightrope Walker (Milestone)
1987: Crazy Rhythm (Milestone)
1988: Carioca (Milestone)
1989: Tudo Bem (Intima)
1990: Curumim (Intima)
1991: Volta a Turma
1994: 21 Anos
1996: Jazz Carnival (Far Out)
1998: Woodland Warrior (Far Out)
1999: Pieces of Ipanema (Far Out)
2000: Before We Forget (Far Out)
2002: Partido Novo (Far Out)
2004: Brazilian Soul  (Far Out)
2006: Pure: The Far Out Years 1995-2006 (Far Out)
2008: Butterfly (Far Out)
2011: Aurora (Far Out)
2016: Fênix (Far Out)
2019: Demos (1973-1975), Vol. 1 & 2 (Far Out)
2020: Azymuth JID004 (Jazz Is Dead) with Adrian Younge and Ali Shaheed Muhammad

References

External links
 Azymuth 
 
 Azymuth interview on Clubbity

Brazilian jazz ensembles
Musical groups established in 1971
Far Out Recordings artists
Milestone Records artists
Atlantic Records artists